The Dynasty of Vimaladharmasuriya I was the ruling family of the Kingdom of Kandy for nearly 150 years, from 1590 to 1739. This royal dynasty played a significant role in the history of Sri Lanka, as it oversaw the reestablishment and flourishing of the Kandyan Kingdom after the Portuguese captured Kandy in the 16th century. The Dynasty of Vimaladharamasooriya I was responsible for ushering in a new era of political stability and cultural vibrancy in Kandy, during which time the kingdom saw significant economic growth and artistic innovation. Despite its eventual downfall in the mid-18th century, the legacy of the Dynasty of Vimaladharmasuriya I continues to endure in Sri Lanka's cultural heritage.

Establishment 

Konappu Bandara Appuhamy, also known as Vimaladharmasuriya I, was born in the Ededuwa village of Peradeniya in the Yatinuwara region. He played a significant role in the history of the Kandyan Kingdom, re-establishing it after defeating the Portuguese at the Battle of Danture.

In 1582, an army from Rajasinghe I of Seethawaka attacked Kandy, causing King Karalliyadde to flee to Mannar with his family and seek the protection of the Portuguese. Rajasinghe I appointed Weerasundara Bandara as the adjudicator of Kandy, but he was later killed by Rajasinghe I through subterfuge. Konappu Bandara, son of Weerasundara Bandara, then fled to the Portuguese and was baptized under the name Dom João of Austria.

Under the leadership of Dom João, the Portuguese captured Kandy with ease and made Dom Filipe the king of Kandy. However, Dom Filipe died under suspicious circumstances, and the Kandyan chieftains accused the Portuguese of poisoning him. Dom João was later accused by the Portuguese, but he and the Kandyan chieftains revolted against them, and the Portuguese army retreated to Mannar. Dom João, later known as Vimaladharmasuriya I, established his own Dynasty and married the only successor of the previous house that ruled the Kingdom of Kandy, the House of Siri Sangha bo. Under the rule of the Dynasty of Vimaladharamasooriya I, five kings ascended to the throne of the Kingdom of Kandy. Eventually, the last ruler of the dynasty, King Narendrasinghe of Kandy, transferred the position of the king to the House of Nayakkar through his marriage to Queen consort Pramila. This marked the end of the reign of the Vimaladharamasooriya I Dynasty.

Monarchs

References

Citations

Bibliography

External links
 Kings & Rulers of Sri Lanka
 Codrington's Short History of Ceylon

 Sinhalese royal houses 
1590 establishments in Asia 
1590s establishments in Asia 
16th-century establishments in Sri Lanka 
1730s disestablishments in Asia 
18th-century disestablishments in Sri Lanka